Ina Clough (10 November 1920 – 25 January 2003) was an English character and bit-part actress.

Clough's first filmed role was in the Mike Leigh film Bleak Moments (1971), and she later appeared on television in Z-Cars (1971), All Creatures Great and Small (1988), Last of the Summer Wine (1986/1988), Cracker (1994), Hetty Wainthropp Investigates (1996) and Coronation Street (1997). Film credits include FairyTale: A True Story (1997) and This Filthy Earth (2001).

Filmography
 Bleak Moments (1971)
 FairyTale: A True Story (1997) - Lady Calling to Fairies
 This Filthy Earth (2001) - Armandine

Television
 Z-Cars, Eps. "The Taker" (1971) - Mrs Smedley
 Play for Today, Ep. "The Bouncing Boy" (1972) - Mrs Gee
 Life for Christine (1980) - Mrs Holly
 All Creatures Great and Small, Ep. "A Present from Dublin" (1988) - Mrs Birtwhistle
 Last of the Summer Wine, Ep. "Crums" (1988) - Lady Passerby
 Medics, 1 Ep. (1992) - Mrs Cator
 The Weekenders (1992) - Seepage Seller
 Hetty Wainthropp Investigates, Ep. "Runaways" (1996) - Bessie
 Coronation Street, 1 Eps. (1997) - Mrs Laight
 Linda Green, Eps. "Focus" (2002) - Elderly Woman

References

External links

1920 births
2003 deaths
English film actresses
English television actresses
20th-century British actresses
20th-century English women
20th-century English people